Ixiamas Airport  is an airport serving the town of Ixiamas in the La Paz Department of Bolivia.

The airport is adjacent to the west side of the town. Runway 35 has a  displaced threshold.

See also

Transport in Bolivia
List of airports in Bolivia

References

External links 
OpenStreetMap - Ixiamas
OurAirports - Ixiamas
Fallingrain - Ixiamas Airport

Airports in La Paz Department (Bolivia)